The following is a list of known fictional characters who are Inhumans, a race of superhumans appearing in American comic books published by Marvel Comics.

Known Inhumans

Inhuman Royal Family 
The Inhuman Royal Family are the ruling class of the Inhumans. Among the members of the Inhuman Royal Family are:

 Black Bolt (Blackagar Boltagon) – King of the Inhumans and husband to Medusa. He has a destructive hypersonic voice that is so loud, he actually remains silent and has undergone rigorous mental training to prevent himself from uttering a sound, even in sleep. The fork-like antenna on Black Bolt's forehead allows more controlled use of his voice and psychically connects him to Lockjaw.
 Medusa (Medusalith Amaquelin Boltagon) – Wife of Black Bolt and Queen of the Inhumans. She is also a former member of the Fantastic Four and the Frightful Four, as well as the mother of Ahura and older sister of Crystal. She has super-strong prehensile hair.
 Crystal (Crystallia Amaquelin Maximoff) – Medusa's sister, ex-wife of Quicksilver and mother of Luna. She is a former member of the Fantastic Four, as well as a former member of the Avengers. She can manipulate Earth, Air, Fire, and Water.
 Gorgon (Gorgon Petragon) – Cousin of Medusa. He has bull-like legs in place of his actual legs that can create intense shockwaves that would be equal to an earthquake.
 Karnak the Shatterer (Karnak Mander-Azur) – Cousin of Black Bolt. He is also a priest and philosopher and chose not to expose himself to the Terrigen Mists. But he does have the ability to sense an opponent's weak points and is a superb martial artist.
 Triton (Triton Mander-Azur) – Karnak's fish-like brother who can breathe underwater and survive the pressures of the deep sea.
 Maximus Boltagon – Also known as Maximus the Mad, he is the brother of Black Bolt and tries to overthrow him from time to time. Maximus has the ability of mind-control.
 The Unspoken – Cousin of Black Bolt. He was once the King of the Inhumans until the rest of the Royal Family rose up against his power-hungry ways. Black Bolt defeated and banished him, decreeing that his actions would be removed from the history books and his name never be uttered again causing him to be referred to as "The Unspoken". The Terrigen Mists gave him the power of "Terrigenesis," the ability to alter his body into any form he wished.
 Ahura Boltagon – Son of Medusa and Black Bolt. He has psychic abilities.
 Luna Maximoff - Daughter of Quicksilver and Crystal. Born human, but was later mutated by the Terrigen Crystal by her father.
 Lockjaw – A large bulldog who was granted the power of teleportation after exposure to the Terrigen Mists. This was due to the Inhumans' experiment on canines.

Inhuman Royal Guards 
The Inhuman Royal Guards are a group of Inhumans that are responsible for protecting the Inhuman Royal Family. Among its members are:

 Chynae – A hydrokinetic Inhuman with pointy ears and gills.
 Dinu – A teenage Inhuman who was disfigured during Terrigenesis and has to wear a mask on his face with eye-holes and a zipper where his mouth is. It has been rumored that the ritual of Terrigenesis has disfigured Dinu so much that simply looking upon his face can cause death.
 Drive – An Inhuman with super-speed.
 Naanis – A tree-like Inhuman, and the twin brother of Timberius.
 Neifi – An Inhuman with gray skin and reptilian features. He possesses super-strength and durability and his skin is like armor.
 Tonaja – An Inhuman with green scaly skin and extendable brown wings.

Genetic Council 
The Genetic Council is a group of Inhumans who are charged with making decisions concerning the use of the Terrigen Mists and the fate of the Inhumans. Among the known members are:

 Arkadine Arcadius – An Inhuman chancellor who is a member of the Genetic Council. He has the ability to animate and speak through statues.
 Avia – A female Inhuman with bird-like wings who is a member of the Genetic Council.
 Carthus – A religious leader of the Genetics Council and spiritual adviser. He was blue with several red spiked horns on his head.
 Cynas – A female one-eyed golden Inhuman who is a member of the Genetic Council.
 Furgar – A reptilian member of the Genetic Council.
 Kitang – Member of the Genetic Council. He was deposed after his several attempts to kidnap Ahura.
 Porcal – A member of the Genetic Council with quill-like growths.
 Sapphiras – A golden female Inhuman who is a member of the Genetic Council.
 Targon – A beastly Inhuman who is a member of the Genetic Council.
 Thernon – Member of the Genetic Council.

Inhuman allies of Maximus 
The following Inhumans are allies of Maximus the Mad:

 Aireo – Also known as Skybreaker. An Inhuman that can manipulate air. Member of Force of Nature. Later a member of the Initiative team stationed in Oregon.
 Falcona – An Inhuman that can control any birds in the Birds of Prey category.
 Leonus – An Inhuman with lion-like attributes.
 Nebulo – An invisible Inhuman who is also known as the Shadow Uncast due to his shadow being visible in the light.
 Seeker – Worked for Maximus during his reign of Atillan. Killed in Inhumans: Untold Stories #6.
 Stallior – A centaur-like Inhuman.
 Timberius – A tree-like Inhuman who can control plants.

Crimson Cadre 
The Crimson Cadre are the Inhumans' personal strike force led by General Ator. Among its members are:

 General Ator – General Ator is the leader of the Crimson Cadre. His current status and whereabouts are unknown.
 Eelak the Agile – An Inhuman with enhanced agility. He later appeared as a member of the Inhuman Royal Guard with a different appearance.
 Margoyle – A gargoyle-like Inhuman. Current status and whereabouts unknown.
 Pulssus – An electrical Inhuman. Current status and whereabouts unknown.
 Rootar – A bark-skinned Inhuman. Current status and whereabouts unknown.

Dark Riders 
The Dark Riders are a group of Mutants and Inhumans drafted by Apocalypse. Among its Inhuman members are:

 Barrage – Founding member of the Dark Riders. He can transform his arms into organic weapons that can absorb a type of energy and fire it in powerful explosive blasts. He was killed by a clone of Madelyne Pryor.
 Foxbat – Founding member of the Dark Riders. He can see in the dark and use his fangs and claws as weapons. He was assassinated by Genesis.
 Gauntlet – Founding member of the Dark Riders. Later becomes a mercenary for hire.
 Hard-Drive – Founding member of the Dark Riders. He can teleport and control machinery. At some point, he was turned into a cyborg. Current whereabouts are unknown.
 Psynapse – Founding member of the Dark Riders and the cousin of Medusa and Crystal. He had telepathy. Killed by the other members of the team, but was revealed to be alive only to be incinerated by the energy released when he attempted to tap into the powers of X-Man.
 Tusk – Founding member of the Dark Riders. Current whereabouts are unknown.

New Generation Inhumans 
 Alaris – An Inhuman and member of the Inhuman Royal Guard with enhanced strength and bulletproof skin. He was sent to Earth as part of a reconnaissance mission/student exchange program.
 Jolen – A vegetation-manipulating Inhuman who was sent to Earth.
 Nahrees – An Inhuman who can generate electricity.
 San – An Inhuman that can sculpt objects out of organic clay.

Universal Inhumans 
The Inhumans and the Kree have experimented on some Centaurians, Dire Wraiths, Kymellians, and Badoon so that when Black Bolt is found, he can lead them into a new era. Besides the Inhuman Royal Family, among the members of the Universal Inhumans are:

 Aladi Ko Eke – The current Queen of the Badoons.
 Arris – A Centaurian who was an adviser to Queed by an alternate Mister Fantastic called Professor R.
 Avoe – The current Queen of the Dire Wraiths.
 Dal Damoc – An Inhuman with levitation abilities who is a member of the Universal Inhumans. He remained on Attilan to watch over it while the Inhuman Royal Family left to rule the Kree Empire. He also became a herald of a new age when the Universal Inhumans return and join.
 Onomi Whitemane – The current Queen of the Kymellians.
 Oola Udonta – The current Queen of the Centaurians.

Light Brigade 
A special team of Universal Inhumans who rescued Human Torch from Annihilus. Among the members of the Light Brigade are:

 Dara Ko Eke – A Badoon who is a member of the Light Brigade. She operates under the alias of All-Knowing.
 Els Udonta – A Centaurian archer who is a member of the Light Brigade. She operates under the alias of Stonethrower.
 Hooud – A size-shifting Dire Wraith who is a member of the Light Brigade. He operates under the alias of Creeping Death.
 Kal Blackbane – A Kymellian swordsman who is a member of the Light Brigade. He operates under the alias of Midnight Blade.
 Prax Ord – A Centaurian with metal skin who is a member of the Light Brigade. He operates under the alias of Metallic Titan.
 Voorr – A Dire Wraith who is a member of the Light Brigade. He operates under the alias of Sun. Voorr can fly and project force fields.

Other Inhumans 
Unless stated otherwise, it can be assumed that the listed Inhumans are residing in Attilan. Among the Inhumans listed here are:

 Aeric – Last seen as a child.
 Agon – Father of Black Bolt, son of Symak, and husband of Rynda. He was elected head of the Inhumans Genetic Council circa 1870. He was killed when Black Bolt used his sonic powers to stop an escaping Kree ship which had crashed into the laboratory in which he was working.
 Albakor – An Inhuman scientist, soldier, and member of the New Inhuman Elite with an aquatic physiology and is an expert in technology. He has great mobility in the oceans and zero gravity.
 Alecto – A leathery-winged Inhuman who is the daughter of Gorgon, the half-sister of Petras, and the former lover of the Alpha Primitive Reyno. She fled Attilan to be able to stay with Reyno and sought amnesty in the Baxter Building. Alecto was later forced to return to Attilan and to deny her relationship with Reyno.
 Ambur – An Inhuman who is the wife of Quelin and mother of Medusa and Crystal.
 Andvari – An engineer who designed the technology to relocate Attilan from the ocean to the Himalayan mountains.
 Arvak – A centaur-like Inhuman that works as a soldier.
 Asmodeus – An Inhuman who has green bat-like wings that works as a guardsman.
 Auran – Has yellow skin and large ears, and the ability to hear anyone if she picks a word and knows their location. She is an inspector in New Attilan and good friends with the NuHuman Frank McGee (who she nicknames Nur). The two are eventually hired by Queen Medusa to hunt her missing husband. Auran is killed when Maximus the Mad causes an explosion, but her daughters convince Reader to use his abilities to "resurrect" her, creating a duplicate Auran. She later has an identity crisis as a side effect.
 Aven – An Inhuman who was the former holder of the Royal Scepter inside the Inhuman Treasury.
 Avian – Last seen as a child.
 Avion – A child who was killed.
 Avius – A winged Inhuman who works as a guardsman.
 Azur
 Banth – An Inhuman who briefly romanced Dazzler while she was in Attilan.
 Belial Toiven – Mother of Rexel Toiven and wife of Usurieus. She has telepathic powers.
 Blaast – An Inhuman Guardsman that worked under Krush. He can fire energy blasts from his hands.
 Bochek
 Budan
 Burron – A reptilian Inhuman that fought High Evolutionary's Eliminators and Gatherers. Although he hasn't demonstrated any powers, Burron was an expert at armed combat.
 Capo – An Inhuman who lives only as an astral entity, possessing bodies as a parasite to sustain his life. He's been the head of the Ennilux Corporation for centuries, if not millennia. Every generation, within the Ennilux's ranks, the creation of a body fitting as the "Capo" host was genetically engineered, but the last ones were too weak, flawed. This has led, for the first time in the history of the organization, to the decision to pass on the "Capo" conscience in the body of a NuHuman that seemed to have the constitution and the genetic sequences required for the transfer
 Centaurius
 Chiron – A centaur-like Inhuman and guardsman. He is the brother of Stallior.
 Corporus
 Cteno – An aquatic Inhuman.
 Cuidador – A green-skinned Inhuman doctor.
 Cyra
 Dendrok
 Desidera – A female Inhuman that works as a Finder. She possesses the ability to create a three dimensional image of Earth and can pull forth specific images of locations by using another character's mental connection to the item being looked for to call forth the image.
 Devlor – An Inhuman who became a member of Fantastic Force. He can transform into a beast-like creature with super-strength and enhanced agility. Current whereabouts and status are unknown.
 Dewoz – An Inhuman who can pass through reflective surfaces into what he called the "Antiverse." He was transformed into a duplicate of an Alpha Primitive by Terrigenesis.
 Diné – A young Inhuman.
 Dominus
 Dorhun – Member of the New Inhuman Elite. He has aquatic traits and was trained as a warrior to battle in zero-gravity combat.
 Dren
 Eldrac the Door – An Inhuman that became a large head-shaped construct through Terrigenesis. He can teleport any Inhumans that enter his mouth to any location.
 Elejea – An Inhuman with blue-green skin and spikes on various areas of the face who is a member of the Inhumans' diplomatic delegation to the United Nations and served under Ambassador Mendicus.
 Entos
 Ertzia – A long-lived 5 ft. 3 in. Inhuman with the ability to generate small virtually impenetrable red containment shells who was a former advisor to Black Bolt. After Black Bolt launched Attilan to the Moon, Ertzia was left behind and later ended up in Ryker's Island.
 Felor – A cat-like Inhuman that is a servant of the Genetics Council.
 Flagman – An Inhuman who worked as a host in the Quiet Room.
 Flaidermaus – A flying furry Inhuman guardsman with a lion-like mane, claws, and bat-like wings.
 Flurgron
 Frag – A reptilian Inhuman that the Genetics Council wanted Tally to marry.
 Galen
 Ghaidor
 Gitel
 Glytra – An Inhuman that can fly.
 Goran
 Goran Malidicta – An Inhuman who alongside his unnamed brothers guarded the cavern that the Terrigen Crystals were in. He was killed by Quicksilver.
 Gordon – The eyeless teleporting Inhuman from Agents of S.H.I.E.L.D.. In the comics, he and Snarkle were exiled to another dimension by King Kalden 2,000 years ago for an unspecified crime. While Snarkle made his way back to Earth, Gordon remained behind where he closed the portal telling Snarkle that he never liked him.
 Grimal
 Ikarys – An Inhuman with bird-like wings. He serves as the Inhumans' scout and sentry.
 Ikelli – An Inhuman from the Inhuman city of Utolan and the brother of Flint who has blue tendrils.
 Iridia – An Inhuman with butterfly wings.
 Itar
 Jiaying – A green-skinned Inhuman with gills instead of a nose.
 Kalden – An ancient Inhuman King who was mentioned to have been responsible for exiling Gordon and Snarkle to another dimension 2,000 years ago for an unspecified crime.
 Kaliban – An Inhuman guardsman and the brother of Yeti who took part in the attack on the Fantastic Four during an event in the Bronx. Like his brother, he resembles a Yeti.
 Kalikya – An Inhuman healer with elongated hands and fingers.
 Kirren – An amphibian/reptilian Inhuman guard. He was killed by Outrider.
 Kobar
 Korath
 Krush – An 8 ft. Inhuman guardsman that can grow to twice his size with amber-hued skin and super-strength.
 Kurani – An Inhuman illusion caster.
 Kylus – An Inhuman who lived in 500 B.C.
 La:
 Lash – An Inhuman with energy conversion ability that comes from the Inhuman city of Orrolan.
 Maelstrom – An energy-manipulating Inhuman who is the son of Phaeder and a Deviant. He is an avatar of Oblivion and currently residing at its realm.
 Magnar – An Inhuman who was mentioned.
 Mala – An Inhuman diviner who can telepathically communicate and hack electronic systems from long distances.
 Makoth
 Makus
 Mander
 Marak
 Marilla – An Inhuman with a bulky head, three toes on each foot, and spots on her body who was the nanny of Crystal (when she was young) and Luna. She was killed by a brainwashed Iron Man.
 Marishi Spin – The chief technology officer of the Ennilux. When he gathered together the company in order to elect their new C.E.O. following the Capo's demise, he also planned to unveil a new piece of technology called the Antigen, an inhibitor of Inhuman abilities. However, the device was stolen by Fantomelle before the presentation.
 Marista – An Inhuman who served as a royal attendant of Medusa.
 Maternal Council of Elders – A group of Inhumans who are the governing group of the Inhuman city of Utolan.
 Daya – An elderly female member of Utolan's Maternal Council of Elders.
 Irellis – A female member of Utolan's Maternal Council of Elders who is the mother of Flint and Ikelli.
 Maya – An Inhuman who is the former nanny of Luna. She can create artificial environments.
 Mendicus – An Inhuman ambassador with a childlike body who is representing Attilan at the United Nations.
 Mikon
 Milena
 Minxi – An Inhuman peasant and an attendant to Medusa who can duplicate the main traits and abilities of an animal for a short time. She helped Medusa to give birth to Ahura. Gorgon and Karnak each developed a crush on her.
 Mojlor – An Inhuman that Tally wanted to marry.
 Mullox
 Nadar – An Inhuman scientist and geneticist who once helped Mister Fantastic find a cure for the Hydro-Men.
 Nallo – An Inhuman musician who plays beautiful music on the strings that are on his arms.
 Nestor – An Inhuman who lived in 500 B.C. as the former ruler of the Inhumans.
 Nollik – An Inhuman who is the mother of Aeric.
 Oracle – A telepathic Inhuman who serves as Black Bolt's oracle and interpreter.
 Ozel – An Inhuman commoner who plotted to catch Quicksilver after he was suspected of stealing the Royal Spectre.
 Payne – An Inhuman guardsman who charge his fists with energy that magnifies his punches.
 Petras – The son of Gorgon and the younger half-brother of Alecto. During Thanos' invasion, Gorgon had him undergo Terrigenesis which gave him the appearance of a green-furred Minotaur.
 Phadros
 Phaeder – An Inhuman geneticist who was exiled from Attilan and lived with Deviants for some time. He is the father of Maelstrom. Phaedar was the one who gave the High Evolutionary the papers containing blueprints for cracking the genetic code. Currently deceased.
 Pinyon
 Piskas
 Puppy – An Inhuman puppy that can teleport.
 Putor
 Quelin – An Inhuman who is the father of Medusa and Crystal and the brother of Rynda.
 Radiant – An Inhuman who has Immortal Skin and Super Strength.
 Rajar
 Ramus
 Randac – The former ruler of the Inhumans and founder of the Terrigen Mists. Killed in Thor #147.
 Ransak the Reject – Son of Maelstrom and Deviant. Lived with Eternals for some time. Current whereabouts are unknown.
 Reader – Reader was a part of the Lor Tribe of Inhumans who settled in Orollan, Greenland. When exposed to the Terrigen Mists, he developed the ability to make anything he reads become real and come to life. His people feared the power he possessed and put out his eyes. Since then, Reader has learned to continue accessing his power in limited ways using brail cards.
 Rexel Toiven – An Inhuman tattoo artist with a weak third arm. He was killed by Portuguese mercenaries.
 Rok – An Inhuman guardsman that worked under Krush. Although he did not demonstrate any powers, he was an expert at armed combat.
 Romeo - An Inhuman with the power of empathy. He becomes briefly romantically involved with a young, time-displaced Iceman.
 Romnar – An Inhuman scientist and researcher.
 Rynda – An Inhuman who is the mother of Black Bolt, the sister of Quelin, and wife of Agon.
 Sanara – An Inhuman from the Inhuman city of Utolan.
 Seeker II – The twin brother of the original Seeker.
 Senschi – A purple-skinned Inhuman with a taloned face, a spiky-finned ridge of hair, bat-like wings instead of arms, and a long spiked tail. He is the Inhuman Royal Family's royal page.
 Sisko – A female member of one of the species of the Inhumans called "The Hidden Ones" who were once kidnapped by Nazis. She has the ability to shapeshift.
 Smilo
 Snarkle – An unspecified monstrous Inhuman who alongside Gordon was exiled to another dimension by King Kalden 2,000 years ago for an unspecified crime. While Snarkle made it back to Earth while Gordon remained in exile, he was defeated by Flint and Iso and then remanded to Newe Attilan's dungeon.
 Somnus – An Inhuman that can create small projectile black balls that puts anyone who is hit by them to either see visions or make them fall asleep.
 Sporr – An Inhuman that has the ability to create duplicates of itself by binary fission.
 Sylk – A female Inhuman guardsman that worked under Krush. She has a ribbon-like lower body.
 Symak
 Tally – An Inhuman that the Genetics Council wanted Frag to marry instead of Mojlor. She committed suicide.
 Tanith
 Tauron
 Telv
 Tethys
 Thera
 Thraxton
 Tolos – A bear-like Inhuman guard with super-strength, sharp claws, and sharp teeth. He was killed by Outrider.
 Ultarnt – An Inhuman scientist that did research on the ritual of Terrigenesis.
 Usurieus Toiven
 Vel
 Veritus – An Inhuman who has the ability to tell if someone is telling the truth or lying.
 Videmus – A blind Inhuman and former member of the Genetic Council who has tendril-like eyes that can attach to the forehead of others allowing him to see their thoughts. He told Quicksilver all about where the Terrigen Mists are. Afterwards, Black Bolt sentenced him to life in solitary confinement where he is not to use his powers to see through others. Gorgon disagreed with this sentence.
 Vinatos – A tall Inhuman doctor with razor sharp nails and close friend to the Inhuman Royal Family, especially Medusa. He aids the Inhuman hybrids (dubbed NuHumans) after their Terringenesis. Vinatos is eventually killed by The Unspoken. His funeral is attended by many of the NuHumans he helped, including Dante Pertuz and Kamala Khan.
 Webelos
 Weebwow
 Yeti – An Inhuman that resembles a Yeti and is the brother of Kaliban.
 Zeta
 Zorvash

Inhuman Hybrids (NuHumans) 
In the wake of Infinity, it is revealed that tribes of Inhumans have existed in secret around Earth and that they had mated with humans, many eventually finding their way into modern society, without knowing their past, producing Inhuman/human hybrids. Inhumanity deals with the aftermath of this revelation.

 Adam Roderick – A Nuhuman that Karnak was tasked with retrieving after he had been captured by A.I.M.'s splinter group I.D.I.C. He was thought to have an enhanced immune system when in truth his real abilities stem from vocally projecting his beliefs into reality.
 Ajay Roy – An Indian celebrity movie star. He was on the red carpet at a film premiere when the mist struck, giving him a monstrous plant-covered wooden form. He lashes out, but is stopped by a fellow Inhuman Dinesh Diol who was at the premier at the time. Both of them were targeted by HYDRA until they are saved by Human Torch, Medusa, Naja, and Triton. Dinesh befriended the four while Ajay escaped into the streets with HYDRA agents in pursuit.
 Alice Taylor-Kedzierski – A housewife who possesses the power to transfer mass between objects. After Alice's powers accidentally shrank herself (along with her neighbors Soojin and Hana Rhee) into the Microverse, they were rescued by the Uncanny Avengers.
 Ana Kravinoff – The daughter of Kraven the Hunter is revealed to be a NuHuman on her mother's side. She managed to avoid Terrigensis, but is embarrassed by her InHuman heritage and kills her aunts to prove herself worthy to her father. She then agrees to guide Flint and Gorgon to Africa to find the hidden Inhuman city of Utolan, but only in the hopes that they may cure her. She is betrayed by the Utolan council and then embraces her nature by allowing the Terrigen Cloud to envelop her. Her Inhuman form and abilities are yet to be revealed.
 Blizzard (Donnie Gill) – A recurring foe of Iron Man and former Thunderbolt who was unexpectedly discovered to have Inhuman ancestry during Captain Atlas' heist on Stark Tower. Originally only able to create ice via a high-tech suit, he now has the ability to manipulate electrical currents and the Terrigenesis had changed the color of his skin.
 Daisy Johnson/Quake – Level 10 Agent and former Director of S.H.I.E.L.D who was also a former Member of the Secret Warriors and the Avengers. Once thought to be a mutant, it was revealed she got her powers from her father Mister Hyde's experiments on himself and her mother's Inhuman DNA.
 Doris – An elderly widow who turned to attorney Matt Murdock for help after her bank foreclosed on her home. After being exposed to the Terrigen Mists, she transformed into a squid-like creature with masses of tentacles in place of arms. She attacked the Avengers A.I. before being persuaded to stop by their Doombot and took off for parts unknown with Medusa.
 Exile – Victor Kohl was an Inhuman and one of the wielders of Mandarin's Black Light ring. He is killed by Arno Stark.
 Fiona – A bird-like Inhuman and former blogger who is the sister of Flynn. She was exposed to the Terrigen Mist while taking selfies and subsequently began blogging about her condition. While trying to commit suicide, she was rescued by members of the Avengers Academy and former members of the New X-Men. Fiona later joined the Avengers Academy.
 Flint (Jason) – A teenage African-American Inhuman. He has the ability to control rocks and stone. Part of his face is made of rocks. He was raised in a small town populated by Inhumans who died when the Terrigen Mist passed through, leaving him the only survivor. He was later revealed to the long-lost son of Irellis of Utolan's Maternal Council of Elders.
 Flynn – Fiona's brother. Has super-strength, enhanced durability, and great leaping skills. He lashes out against everyone that wronged him only to be talked down by Fiona and the Avengers Academy students. Flynn later enrolls in the Latverian School of Science.
 Fulmina (Sylvia Prell) – A college student from New York City who manifested her Inhuman powers during Thanos' invasion of Earth. She possesses the ability to transform herself into an organism of pure electricity. Fulmina was discovered by the Superior Spider-Man (Doctor Octopus' mind in Spider-Man's body).
 Fume – Daryl is a gas-controlling Inhuman who is a member of Lash's tribe.
 Geldhoff – A teenage Latverian exchange student who can release powerful bursts of energy. He was captured by Monica Rappaccini and A.I.M. after a brief confrontation with Emma Frost and the X-Men.
 Glorianna (Rhonda Fleming) – A mutation expert who was called in by Parker Industries to figure out the Terrigen Mists' effects on mutants, but she had Inhuman DNA and went through Terrigenesis. Her cocoon was stolen by Lash. Spider-Man 2099 chased Lash to save Rhonda. When she emerged, she teleported Lash away and declared that she will be the Earth's new god. Spider-Man 2099 fought her until she accidentally hurt her girlfriend Jasmine. Glorianna then teleported herself into seclusion.
 Grid – Dinesh Deol is an engineer from India whose Terrigenesis enabled him to see the electromagnetic spectrum as well as using magnetokinesis. He stopped Ajay Roy when he lashed out. Both of them were targeted by HYDRA until they are saved by Human Torch, Medusa, Naja, and Triton.
 Grove – An Inhuman who sided with Lash.
 Haechi – Mark Sim is a Korean American boy who can absorb energy, perform energy blasts, and use high amounts of energy to turn into a draconian bull-like creature.
 Hub the Living Engine – Hubartes Plutaris underwent Terrigenesis and had awoken to find he'd lost most of his body save his head that became a mechanical construct. Unable to communicate with the outside world, he became a prisoner trapped within his agony as his power manifested in the form of energy generation, optic beams and the ability to control any energized system he's connected too. Eventually, the Inhuman Royal Family of Attilan found him and hooked him into devices aboard a thought-powered ship called The Royal Inhuman Vessel.
 Dante Pertuz – A Latino teen who can transform himself into a being of fire & brimstone. Since gaining his powers, Dante has gone by the superhero alias Inferno.
 Iron Cross II (Carrie Gruler) – The "Iron Man of Germany" and the daughter of the original Iron Cross. Her Terrigenesis caused a molecular bonding ability that merged her with a suit of armor.
 Iso (Xiaoyi) – A young woman from a rural village in China. She has the ability to control the pressure around her.
 Jack Chain – An Inhuman on Lash's side who can manifest Darkforce chains.
 Janus Jardeen – An Inhuman who can be undetected by anyone with precognition. He was a former minion of Kingpin before his move to San Francisco caused him to temporarily work with Black Cat's Gang. Kingpin later regained his services when he found out that the human trafficking business that he and Man Mountain Marko were working for left him undetected by Ulysses' precognition.
 Junkman of Brooklyn (Gavrel Achtor) – A man who can telekinetically lift junk and toss them towards his opponents. He tried to get revenge on Sarah Garza for accidentally destroying his apartment complex, but was shot and killed by Nick Fury Jr.
 Kaboom (Adriana) – A teenage girl with electrical powers working for Lineage, and an enemy of Kamala Khan. Not knowing her full strength at the time, Kamala accidentally gives her a neck brace.
 Kamran – A family friend and love interest of Kamala Khan's. When he activates his ability, his skin glows a shade of blue, and he can cause what he touches to explode. He is later revealed to be working for Lineage and Kamala defeats him on New Atillan.
 Kid Kaiju – Kei Kawade is a Japanese American kid from Atlanta, Georgia who loved Kaiju monsters of all kinds. His life changed when the Terrigen Mists awakened his Inhuman DNA allowing him to summon and even create monsters of any kind through drawing pictures.
 Lineage (Gordon "Gordo" Nobili) - Before Terrigenesis, he was the patriarch of his struggling Maggia family. After Terrigenesis, he finds himself with purple skin, several massive spikes growing from his head, super-strength, and the ability to communicate with his ancestors and descendants. However, soon after hatching, he loses his two sons (one to crossfire in a huge firefight and one committing suicide after seeing what he had become), and vows vengeance on the person he thinks is responsible for everything...Punisher.
 Living Dream (Thahn Ng) – Thahn was a living breathing sentient being reborn as a Nuhuman who lived on the tiny nation of Sin-Cong. But a great many individuals who developed such physical oddities were hunted down and burned alive in their homes by the nation's military by the command of the ruling dictator of the nation. As the Royal Inhuman diplomatic mission of Attilan approached his homeland aboard the R.I.V, he bombarded the crew with the memories of all the deceased Nuhumans who were executed under the Commissar's orders in a bid to push them towards his goal of revenge. He eventually ended up possessing the body of the deceased former Commissar of Sin-Cong.
 Meruda – A weather-controlling Inhuman who once went on a Satanic killing spree against members of Storm's mother tribe in Kenya.
 Moon Girl – Lunella Lafayette is a 9-year-old African-American girl that possess an astoundingly large intellect. She was able to identify the Inhuman gene within her own DNA and feared being transformed into a monster due to the changes brought about by the Terrigen Mists. Hoping that Kree technology could protect her, she was eventually caught in a T-cloud and developed the ability of Neuralkinesis; being able to transfer her consciousness into Devil Dinosaur and vice versa; as well as increase the intelligence level of Devil's brain, enabling her to partially speak while commandeering his body.
 Michelle – A female Ohio State University student whose Terrigenesis transformed her into a red-skinned beast with wings and a tail.
 Miss Mech – Disabled tween female confined to a wheel chair at an early age. She grew up watching kaiju/Giant Mecha flicks before the Terrigen Cloud hit over New York, as a result she gained the ability to mentally control and fashion giant robots out of any and all mechanical parts within her range. Initially mistook Kid kaiju and his friend Lunella as evil monster controllers, but they've reconciled and become fast friends.
 Mother Bones – An Inhuman with bony protrusions that sided with Lash.
 Mosaic – An ex professional athlete transformed by Terrigenesis into a disembodied being of energy capable of invading any host, accessing all their memories and talents and then moving on without being detected.
 Ms. Marvel – Kamala Khan is a shapeshifting 16-year-old Muslim of Pakistani descent from Jersey City. After realizing that her Inhuman abilities give her the means to emulate her idol Carol Danvers, Kamala takes up her hero's former identity as the new Ms. Marvel.
 Naja – A teenage Inhuman with green leopard skin, a long tail, and wings on her arms that give her the ability to fly. Naja also possesses invisibility and telescopic vision.
 Nocculus – An Inhuman on Lash's side where his third eye enables him to perform mind-control and power detection abilities.
 Nur (Frank McGee) – A middle-aged man who can generate bright, soothing light from his shining yellow eyes. Before Terringenesis, he was a New York police officer, but his wife became afraid of him after the change. So he moved to New Attilan where he became the head of city security.
 Panacea (Ash Minnick) – A newly emerged Inhuman from Sydney, Australia who was captured and imprisoned in a cell to be shown off as a freak during a mock protest by a group of human zealots. She was found after the Royal Inhuman ambassador Crystal was visiting Sydney on a humanitarian mission. She was rescued by Naja. Panacea has the ability to heal/restore biological organisms to their optimal health.
 Quickfire (Barbara McDevitt) – A former corporate spy who discovered the ability to slow down time around her targets, but only for one person at a time. After being revealed as an Inhuman, she was hired by the Cortex Corporation to infiltrate the ruins of Attilan.
 Raina – The Inhuman character from Agents of S.H.I.E.L.D. made a brief cameo in Inhuman Annual #1 sporting her iconic flower dress.
 Randall Jessup – A S.H.I.E.L.D. scientist working with Bruce Banner who underwent Terrigenesis which turned him into a monster that can grow upon absorbing anger.
 Ren Kimura – A Japanese-American dancer who can conjure razor sharp metal ribbons from her fingertips. She joined the Fearless Defenders after being rescued from Thanos' forces.
 Richard Schlickeisen – He was Anya Corazon's social studies teacher at the time when he underwent Terrigenesis where he was proven to be invisible to machines. His cocoon was stolen by A.I.M. and later sold to June Covington who later took his DNA.
 Sarah Garza – A former S.H.I.E.L.D. technician from Park Slope, Brooklyn, who suddenly found herself able to generate powerful explosions of energy. After being outfitted with a regulator suit, she was appointed to the Secret Avengers by Maria Hill. She quickly resigned from the Avengers unit after seeing how violent they were, and was placed in confinement until she could learn to control her powers in order to return to her old job.
  – An Inhuman on Lash's side with metal shards protruding from her body.
 Shredded Man (Ivan Guerrero) – A powerful Inhuman who can communicate with and control plant life on a global scale.
 Spark – A pyrokinetic Inhuman on Lash's side.
 Swain (Jovana) - A newly emerged Inhuman who became the Captain of Princess Crystal's main ship called the R.I.V. it was believed her only talent was a manifested tail. In truth she is a powerful Empathic Beacon who can influence the mood of others via emotional dialog.
 Synapse (Emily Guerrero) – A young Inhuman and granddaughter of Shredded Man with telepathic powers who is a member of the Avengers Unity Division.
 Techno Golem (Tomoe) - A young Inhuman crime boss from Japan who can control, bond with and physically as well as mentally; assimilate with various forms of technology.
 Thane – The last remaining child of Thanos. The invasion of Earth's true main purpose was for Thanos to find and kill his son. Once Terrigenesis occurs, Thane's uncontrolled powers inadvertently annihilate the entirety of the hidden Inhuman outpost city he lived in. In the end, Thane traps Thanos and Proxima Midnight in "a state of living death" and departs to the stars with Ebony Maw to "carve out an even greater legacy".
 Toro – The former sidekick of the original Human Torch, as well as a founding member of both the Invaders and the Kid Commandos. He was previously thought to be a mutant, but was retconned into possessing Inhuman heritage.
 Uber Alles – A Neo-Nazi Inhuman who can create air vortexes. He later sided with Lash following a fight with Iron Cross and the Invaders.
 Ulysses Cain – Ulysses Cain is an Ohio State University student whose Terrigenesis gave him the ability to forecast the future, leaving him at the centre of the second superhero civil war as Iron Man and Captain Marvel fight over how to use his dangerous and powerful new abilities.

Super-Inhumans 
In the wake of Death of the Inhumans, it is revealed that the Kree had created a new race of Inhumans which was dubbed as Super-Inhumans. This new race was engineered from birth to possess almost all of their Inhuman abilities and none of their humanity, something the Kree thought to be problematic.

Vox – The first and currently the only member of this race, he is described as the "voice and the wrath of the gods and the full-throated scream of the Kree Empire". Besides his great powers, he also wields a scythe consisting of a handle and blade made of an unknown kind of red energy and a small sharp dagger. His costume also possess a similar resemblance to that of Ahura Boltagon from the "Earth X" reality. Vox is later revealed to be actually a program designed by the Kree which is forcefully imprinted on some selected Inhumans. When the program was activated those who were selected would lose all of their identities and free will and are genetically transformed into Vox, obedient deadly hunters. Black Bolt ended up wiping out the entire Vox army, but not without some Kree escaping the slaughter. The program was apparently used in the Supreme Intelligence as Vox reappeared now wearing an emerald costume instead of the black one with crimson highlights, and calling himself as Vox Supreme. He fights Carol Danvers and forces her to kill the Avengers.

Other version of Inhumans

Inhumans of Earth-691 
In an alternate future of the Marvel Universe inhabited by the Guardians of the Galaxy, some new Inhumans are present. Among these Inhumans are:

 Anemone – An Inhuman with paralyzing tentacles.
 Composite – An Inhuman bred by Loki who was the leader of the enslaved Inhumans. He has all the powers of Black Bolt, Medusa, Gorgon and Triton.
 Egressor – An Inhuman with psionic filtration.
 Exempler – An Inhuman who was a prototype experiment done by Loki and is the "stepfather" of Composite. He has all the powers of Black Bolt, Medusa, Gorgon, and Triton.
 Imprint – An Inhuman bred by Loki with a dangerous touch.
 Phobia – An Inhuman bred by Loki who can create fear illusions.
 Stupor – An Inhuman bred by Loki who has the ability to reduce his opponents motor skills.
 Talon – A catlike Inhuman with claws, super-strength, and super-speed who is a member of the Guardians of the Galaxy.
 Wormhole – An Inhuman bred by Loki who can create wormholes.

Inhumans of Earth-1610 
 Densitor – Maximus' flunky who can presumably increase his strength, durability and mass, enough to become fireproof.
 Tri-Clops (Sapphire) – An Inhuman with clairvoyant vision (including the power to see the invisible) in her third eye.
 An unnamed Inhuman who can produce a swarm of insect-like flying creatures from his body.

Marvel Cinematic Universe

Appearing in Marvel's Agents of S.H.I.E.L.D. 
The Marvel Television series Marvel's Agents of S.H.I.E.L.D. has introduced Inhumans most of which were created specifically for the show.

 Abby – A young Inhuman girl in the year 2091 with density manipulation. After being trained by Jemma Simmons and defeating Basha's champion in the Lighthouse's arena called the Crater, Abby was sold to Basha by Kasius.
 Alisha Whitley – An Inhuman loyal to Jiaying who has the ability to create multiple clones of herself with a hive mind to control each one. She was defeated by Lincoln Campbell and Melinda May. Alisha was seen cooperating with S.H.I.E.L.D. in Season 3. One of her clones was killed by Lash. While swayed to Hive's side, Alisha is later killed by a Kree Reaper.
 Alveus/Hive – An Inhuman who can inhabit the bodies of the dead and acquire their memories. Thousands of years ago, the Kree created it from a Mayan hunter to lead their Inhuman army. Inhumans, fearing its power, banded together with humans to banish it from Earth through a portal to a planet called Maveth. Hydra was founded in ancient times to find a way to bring it back and sent it several sacrifices over the millennia- most recently, a NASA team led by Will Daniels. The Hive killed and possessed these sacrifices, and also wiped out the civilisation which used to live on Maveth, tirning the planet into a wasteland. During a mission to rescue the Hive in mid-season 3, Hydra's new leader Grant Ward was killed by Phil Coulson while Will Daniels' body (inhabited by the Hive) was destroyed by Leo Fitz. The Hive then took over Ward's body and escaped to Earth. Hive is later killed when Lincoln Campbell sacrifices his life to blow up the Quinjet outside of Earth's orbit.
 Ben – An Inhuman telepath in the year 2091. After helping Daisy Johnson and Jemma Simmons cover up some information that he found out, Kasius had Sinara kill Ben.
Charles Hinton - Father of Robin. A teacher who became homeless after terrigenesis made it so anyone who touched him shared a vision of an impending death. Taken by Hydra and used by Hive.
 Daisy/Skye Johnson "Quake" – Jiaying's daughter and a S.H.I.E.L.D. agent who has the power to manipulate vibration following her exposure to the Terrigen mists. She is able to tap into the vibrational energy of everything around her.
 Dwight Frye – An Inhuman with the ability to sense other Inhumans where he suffers severe pain and breaks into a rash when in close proximity. He assisted Lash in his campaign to slaughter other Inhumans until he was captured by the ATCU and murdered by Lash as a result.
 Elena Rodriguez "Yo-Yo" – A young Colombian Inhuman who can move at fast speeds while also returning from where she started. Believing her new power to be a gift from God, uses her gift to fight corrupt elements within the Colombian political system, including the National Police of Colombia. This briefly put her into conflict with S.H.I.E.L.D. As they saw that Rodriguez was using her powers for good, they recruited her into the Secret Warriors. Eventually, her speed evolved to the point where she does not need to return to her starting point.
 Ethan Johnston – A young Inhuman who was kidnapped and eventually killed by Dr. List and his fellow HYDRA scientists after many hours of experimentation.
 Eva Belyakov – A Russian Inhuman, gifted with super strength, who went rogue after stealing an assortment of Terrigen Crystals from Afterlife which she used to trigger the terrigenesis of her daughter Katya. She was killed by Melinda May after causing mayhem in Bahrain while being controlled by her daughter.
 Flint "Pebbles" – An Inhuman living on the Lighthouse in the year 2091. After undergoing terrigenesis, Flint develops geokinesis.
 General Androvich – A Russian man who is a former assassin and Minister of Defense that is allied with Gideon Malick and Russian delegate Anton Petrov in a plot to eliminate Prime Minister Dimitri Olshenko. His Inhuman ability has him manifesting his shadow into a Darkforce-powered shadow being that can change its density at will. General Androvich was later killed by Bobbi Morse.
 Gordon – Gordon was an eyeless Inhuman and the right-hand man of Jiaying. He has the ability to teleport himself from one area to another. Aside from himself, Gordon can also teleport others so long as he is making direct contact with them. When teleporting, Gordon can generate fields of reflective blue energy which are impervious to gunfire. His main mission was to protect and transport the rest of the Inhuman population in and out of their settlement Afterlife. He supported Jiaying's decision to trick their own people into starting a war against S.H.I.E.L.D. where they attacked the Iliad. Gordon was killed in a battle by Leo Fitz during Gordon's conflict with him, Alphonso Mackenzie, and Phil Coulson. In season 7, a young version of himself helps Coulson, until he is caught and killed by Nathaniel Malick, who transfers his power to John Garrett.
 Inhuman Primitives – Created through Holden Radcliffe's experiments which attempted to replicate the creation of Inhumans that was sponsored by Hive. They are created through a pathogen combination of Terrigen Crystals, the blood of Daisy Johnson and a Kree Reaper, and Hive's own parasitic organism. The first group of Inhuman Primitives were created from five captive members of the Watchdogs. Despite the inferiority of the Primitives, Hive considered the experiments a success and intended to transform a large portion of humanity by dispersing the transforming agent with a high-altitude nuclear explosion.
  James/J.T. Slade "Hellfire" – James is a former mercenary and demolitions expert who was banished from Afterlife after he broke into Jiaying's archives. Thus, he'd been denied terrigenesis, and has been bitter towards Jiaying. Hive and Daisy Johnson later subjected James to terrigenesis where he gained the ability to charge anything up for a fiery explosion.
 Jiaying – Mother of Daisy/Skye Johnson and Kora, and wife of Calvin Zabo, who helped new Inhumans manage their newfound powers and appearances. She had the power of longevity and a healing factor (both required draining the life force of others) which was realized by aging HYDRA member Daniel Whitehall, who vivisected and experimented on her living body to obtain the secret to eternal youth. Her husband managed to put her back together, although a number of scars remained. However, the mutilation also destroyed her sense of morals. At the end of Season 2, she manipulated the Inhumans into a war with S.H.I.E.L.D., perceiving the latter as a threat. She was eventually killed by Calvin who snapped her back while she was attempting to murder her daughter. When the team time travels, Jiaying is sought to help find a cure for Yo-Yo, and is pivotal in Kora and Daisy connecting.
 Joey Gutierrez "Meltdown" – An Inhuman with the ability to melt any metallic object in a range of three meters around him, especially by touching them. The melting effect does not only affect the item he is touching, but also other items in a close range. His power tends to cause explosions when touching vehicles, as the fuel explodes due to the decompression. He was a member of the Secret Warriors team, but chose to retuen to civillian life.
 Katya Belyakov – Eva's young daughter who developed the power of sense manipulation. Jaiying refused to allow her to undergo terrigenesis, but was later subjected to it by her mother. Due to her young age, the lack of proper mental preparation, and "a darkness" Jaiying saw within her, she became unstable, displaying several signs of psychopathic schizophrenia. She started causing carnage in Bahrain, while controlling many people including her mother. Forced to choose between further loss of innocent lives and the death of a maniacally murderous Powered child,Melinda May had to shoot her.
 Kora - The daughter of Jiaying and half-sister of Daisy who had a hard time controlling her energy-manipulating abilities. She committed suicide in 1983. Because of the Chronicoms interfering with the timeline, her fate was changed when she was approached by Nathaniel Malick and persuaded to side with him. When the Chronicoms follow S.H.I.E.L.D. back to the original timeline, Kora defects to Daisy's side. Following Nathaniel's defeat, Kora accompanies Daisy and Daniel Sousa on a S.H.I.E.L.D. mission.
 Dr. Andrew Garner "Lash" – Melinda May's estranged husband, professor of Psychology, S.H.I.E.L.D. consultant Psychiatrist trusted to evaluate Inhumans for potential agents, and to treat existing agents. He underwent terrigenesis from Jiaying's booby trapped ledger. His transformation changed him physically, turning him into a blue-skinned beast-man with a long mane growing from his scalp down to his upper back, known as Lash. He was  able to interchange between these forms for some time before permanently changing into the latter. Armed with super strength and energy manipulation, and an irresistible need to be near other Inhumans, he hunted and killed dozens of them. He was later killed by Hellfire after using his powers to save Daisy Johnson from Hive.
 Li - The second-in-command of Jiaying in 1983 who can conjure knives from thin air. He was subjected to a blood transfusion overseen by Nathaniel Malick where his blood samples were placed into the mercenary Durant. Li was later killed by Kora.
 Lincoln Campbell "Sparkplug" – Lincoln Campbell is an Inhuman doctor who previously worked in Afterlife as a transitioner. He had electricity manipulation powers after terrigenesis. He helped Skye understand the true extent of her transformation. Originally siding with Jiaying during the War against the Inhumans, he began to doubt her intentions seeing her kill innocent agents, and after learning the truth from Skye, helped S.H.I.E.L.D. defeat Jiaying. In the aftermath of the war, Campbell attempted to start a new peaceful life, but was forced to go into hiding when he was pursued by a murderous Inhuman named Lash and the ATCU. Lincoln Campbell later sacrifices his life to blow up the Quinjet that he and Hive were on outside of Earth's orbit.
 Lori Henson – The wife of Shane Henson, Lori Henson was an Inhuman who lived in Afterlife before the War against the Inhumans began, becoming a friend of Alisha. When Gordon relocated the citizens of the hidden settlement during the War, she and her husband Shane returned to their apartment in Hollywood, California. Henson had the ability to generate fire from her arms as she did before she was killed by Lash.
 Lucio "Medusa-eyes" – An Inhuman who worked with the National Police of Colombia. Lucio has the ability to trap people in a rigor mortis-like state by staring at them. As he was unable to control the power, Lucio was forced to wear sunglasses at all times. He was later abducted by HYDRA where Hive used his powers to sway him to his side. Lucio was later killed by Joey Gutierrez.
 Michael – An Inhuman who resides at Afterlife. He was later evacuated from Afterlife during Jiaying's war on S.H.I.E.L.D.
 R. Giyera – Giyera was gifted with Inhuman powers by HYDRA and became the head of security for Endotex Labs, working directly under Gideon Malick to ensure no one learned of their true intentions for the Inhumans. Giyera has the power to use telekinesis to move objects at his will. He was able to lift two discarded handguns and make them stay in the air, while pulling the trigger to shoot at Lance Hunter and Bobbi Morse, by simply rising his hands. Later, he summoned a metal pipe by directing his hand towards it, using it as a blunt weapon against Morse. As the head of security for the ATCU and the personal bodyguard of Gideon Malick, Giyera has extensive knowledge of martial arts. He chose to fight Bobbi Morse without his powers and gave her a competitive battle that was disrupted by Lance Hunter's interference. Giyera was later killed by Leo Fitz using a special gun that was in stealth mode.
 Raina "Flowers/Thorn" – A former member of Project Centipede who, after terrigenesis, became a thorn-covered Inhuman with claws and yellow eyes. She has also gained enhanced strength and durability. Her new form is apparently uncomfortable even for her as her insides feel malformed. She was the first recorded Inhuman to have precognition powers. She was eventually murdered by Jiaying after her precognitive visions allowed her to see Jiaying's plan to start a war with S.H.I.E.L.D.
Robin Hinton - The prophet. Charles Hinton's daughter, Robin began showing prolific precognition at a very young age. 
 Shane Henson – The husband of Lori Henson, Shane Henson was an Inhuman who lived in Afterlife and went into hiding. He possessed the ability to levitate a few inches above the ground. Shane was later killed by Lash.
 Tucker Shockley – An elite member of the Watchdogs who underwent terrigenesis when trying to see if Senator Ellen Nadeer was an Inhuman. His terrigenesis caused him to explode and then reassemble his own molecules.
 Vijay Nadeer – An Inhuman who is the brother of a senator named Ellen Nadeer who distrusts Inhumans and sees them as a threat to society. Following his first terrigenesis, he remained in his cocoon for months. Once he finally emerged, he had super-speed. After being shot by his sister and tossed off the helicopter into the water by the Watchdogs with her, Vijay's body formed another terrigenesis cocoon around itself as he sank.
 Wilton – Doctor Wilton was an Inhuman called by Jiaying after she refused medical attention from S.H.I.E.L.D. following sustaining a gunshot wound when she was in negotiations with Robert Gonzales. While Skye, Lincoln Campbell, and Jiaying talked, Wilton removed the bullet fragments from Jiaying's shoulder and stitched her wound. Skye asked Doctor Wilton if Jiaying needed a blood donation, but Campbell started arguing again before Wilton could answer.
 Yat-Sen – An elderly Inhuman with unknown powers. Along with Jiaying, he prepared young Inhumans for terrigenesis and helped the newly transformed in their settlement Afterlife.

Appearing in Marvel's Inhumans 
The Inhuman Royal Family and other notable Inhumans from the comics appeared in the Marvel Television series Marvel's Inhumans. They consist of:

 Black Bolt (Blackagar Boltagon) – The silent king of the Inhuman city of Attilan whose voice is so loud he does not speak and instead relies on sign language to communicate. – Portrayed by Anson Mount.
 Medusa (Medusalith Amaquelin Boltagon) – The wife of Black Bolt with long red prehensile hair that can stretch.
 Crystal (Crystallia Amaquelin) – The princess of the Inhuman Royal Family and sister of Medusa who can manipulate Earth, Air, Fire, and Water.
 Gorgon (Gorgon Petragon) – An Inhuman with cattle-like hooves.
 Karnak (Karnak Mander-Azur) – A member of the Royal Family with a fighting ability who can exploit an enemy's weakness.
 Triton (Triton Mander Azur) – An Inhuman with an aquatic fish-like appearance and a fin on his head.
 Lockjaw – An Inhuman Dog with the power of teleportation.
 Auran – A member of the Royal Guard with a regenerative healing factor that is loyal to Maximus.
 Iridia – In this show, Iridia still had her butterfly wings and is depicted as the daughter of Loyolis and Paripan and the sister of Bronaja.
 Eldrac – An Inhuman who becomes part of a wall that can teleport anyone to the place they want to go.
 Kitang – Leader of the Genetic Council. He was killed by Maximus.
 Pulsus – An electricity-manipulating Inhuman that is loyal to Maximus and is strong enough to subdue Medusa and Lockjaw. He was killed by one of the surfers that befriended Gorgon.
 Bronaja – A recently emerged Inhuman who developed the ability to see into the future of anyone who touches him.
 Duodon – An Inhuman whose projector-like eyes can project what events have happened. As he can't see with those eyes, he requires assistance with getting around.
 Flora – A plant-manipulating Inhuman who became an agent for the Inhuman Royal Guard that is loyal to Maximus.
 Locus – An Inhuman who became an agent of the Royal Guard that is loyal to Maximus and has echolocation ability. She was later taken prisoner by Black Bolt and Maximus in order to find Gorgon and Triton. Before dying of her fatal gunshot wound caused by one of the cannabais farmers, she tells Black Bolt and Medusa that Crystal is on Oahu and to make some changes to Attilan when they returns.
 Loyolis – An Inhuman and the father of Bronaja and Iridia who has reptilian hands.
 Mordis – The second most dangerous Inhuman on Attilan with powerful energy beams held back by his special mask who was imprisoned by Black Bolt until he was freed by Maximus to help Auran hunt down the Inhuman Royal Family.
 Paripan – An Inhuman and the mother of Bronaja and Iridia.
 Sakas – An acid-spitting Inhuman who became an agent for the Inhuman Royal Guard that is loyal to Maximus. He was accidentally killed in an explosion caused by Mordis at Evan Declun's facility.
 Sammy – A recently transformed Inhuman with a heat touch that befriended Black Bolt at the Oahu Corrections Facility.
 Tibor – A member of the Genetic Council who is an old friend of Maximus.
 Jane – A newly turned Inhuman who lived in Hawaii and went through Terrigenesis during the Inhuman Outbreak and she has eyesight is wider than a normal human's, signified by her golden eyes. While on the run from a group of military troops, she met Triton who attempted to save her. Just before Triton could take her to Attilan, she was suddenly shot from behind and seemingly killed by Hunter One.

Appearing in Doctor Strange in the Multiverse of Madness 
The Marvel Studios film Doctor Strange in the Multiverse of Madness reintroduces characters from the Marvel Television series Marvel's Inhumans. They consist of:

 Black Bolt (Blackagar Boltagon) – The silent king of the Inhuman city of Attilan whose voice is so loud he does not speak and instead relies on sign language to communicate, and a member of the Illuminati. – Portrayed by Anson Mount.

References 

 
Lists of Marvel Comics characters by organization